Bierley is a former township in the West Riding of Yorkshire whose name now mainly refers to a neighbourhood in the Tong ward of the City of Bradford, West Yorkshire, England.

Geography 
Neighbouring places are in clockwise order: Oakenshaw in the south, Low Moor, Odsal, Bankfoot, West Bowling, East Bowling, Dudley Hill, Holme Wood, Westgate Hill and Tong Village in the City of Bradford and East Bierley in Kirklees in the southeast.

History 
In 1872 Bierley was recorded as a township that included the village of Wibsey, the hamlets of Bierley Lane, Carr Lane, Hilltop, Odsal Moor, Woodhouse Hill and Folly Hall, and the districts of Low Moor (where the Leeds, Bradford and Halifax Junction Railway had a station) and Slack. Its population was about 9,500 persons in 1841 and 12,500 in 1861. The township was also known as North Bierley, to distinguish it from similarly named places. This is remembered in the name of North Bierley cemetery, opened in 1902 and situated between Low Moor and Buttershaw.

The former township has been split up following administrative reorganisation. The modern housing estate of Bierley, Bierley Hall Wood, and the hamlets of Bierley Lane and Hilltop now belong to Tong ward. Low Moor and Carr Lane are part of Wyke ward, while Wibsey, Slack and Folly Hall are in Wibsey ward.

Notable buildings

St John the Evangelist, Bierley, dating from 1766, now a Grade II* listed building.

A set of two-storey yeoman's houses in Shetcliffe Lane dates back to the 15th or 16th century. The originally timber-framed buildings were encased in gritstone masonry in 1625 and have also been declared Grade II* listed buildings.

Notable people
Charles Sutton (1906–1945), cricketer

See also
Listed buildings in Bradford (Tong Ward)

References 

Areas of Bradford
Housing estates in England
Former civil parishes in West Yorkshire